The Hampton Roads Admirals were a professional ice hockey team in the East Coast Hockey League (ECHL). They played in Norfolk, Virginia at the Norfolk Scope Arena from 1989 until 2000, when the owners purchased an expansion American Hockey League franchise that became the Norfolk Admirals. In 2015, the AHL Admirals were relocated and the ECHL returned to Norfolk with the current Norfolk Admirals.

Expansion
One-time Chicago Cubs and National League executive Blake Cullen was looking to expand into the Norfolk area for hockey. He arranged an exhibition game between the Virginia Lancers and the Carolina Thunderbirds (originally listed as the Carolina Cougars) to take place at the Norfolk Scope. Cullen said that he "would be happy with 3,000 fans and 4,000 or more would be very encouraging. " The game, played on a Wednesday night between a fourth and fifth place team, drew over 6,200 fans. Because of the turnout, the ECHL was willing to offer Cullen a new franchise for free. However, when a group of five businessmen offered the league $25,000 for territorial rights, Commissioner Pat Kelly told Cullen that he "was a man of his word" and offered the franchise to him for the same price, in which Cullen accepted.

A naming contest would be held in the summer of 1989. Bettie Ann denDekker would win the contest with the name "Admirals".

Inaugural Season
The Hampton Roads Admirals were introduced for the 1989-90 season and developed a rivalry with the Virginia Lancers of Vinton, Virginia throughout the season. The Admirals provided "attention and credibility to the ECHL by drawing an average of 5,885 fans in their inaugural season. Until the Admirals joined the league, owners considered 2,000 fans to be "a good crowd. They would make the post-season in their first season, going 29-29-2 before losing to the Erie Panthers three games to two in a five game series of the opening round of the Riley Cup playoffs. The credibility also caught the attention of two NHL teams: the Detroit Red Wings and the Washington Capitals. Detroit agreed to send eight prospects, while the Washington Capitals agreed to sending a goaltender and an unspecified number of players.

Championships
The Admirals were the flagship franchise of the ECHL, having won Jack Riley Cups in 1991 and 1992, and the Patrick J. Kelly Cup in 1998. The three championships won by the franchise is matched only by the South Carolina Stingrays and Alaska Aces. Two years later, the Admirals moved up to the American Hockey League (AHL).

Season-by-season record

Playoffs
1989–90: Lost to Erie 3-2 in quarterfinals.
1990–91: Defeated Richmond 3-1 in quarterfinals; defeated Johnstown 4-1 in semifinals; defeated Greensboro 4-1 to win championship.
1991–92: Defeated Raleigh 3-1 in first round; defeated Richmond 2-0 in quarterfinals; defeated Greensboro 3-1 in semifinals; defeated Louisville 4-0 to win championship.
1992–93: Lost to Raleigh 3-1 in quarterfinals.
1993–94: Defeated South Carolina 2-1 in first round; lost to Wheeling 3-1 in quarterfinals.
1994–95: Lost to Tallahassee 3-1 in first round.
1995–96: Lost to Richmond 3-0 in first round.
1996–97: Defeated Roanoke 3-1 in first round; lost to South Carolina 3-2 in quarterfinals.
1997–98: Defeated Peoria 3-0 in first round; defeated Roanoke 3-2 in quarterfinals; defeated Wheeling 4-2 in semifinals; defeated Pensacola 4-2 to win championship.
1998–99: Lost to Richmond 3-1 in first round.
1999–00: Defeated Huntington 3-2 in first round; lost to Trenton 3-2 in quarterfinals.

Team records

Notable players
  Serge Aubin
  Byron Dafoe
  Aaron Downey
  Olaf Kolzig
  Patrick Lalime
  Jan Lasak
  Stephen Valiquette

References

External links
The Internet Hockey Database - Hampton Roads Admirals

Defunct ECHL teams
Ice hockey teams in Virginia 
Sports in Norfolk, Virginia
Norfolk Admirals
Defunct ice hockey teams in the United States
1989 establishments in Virginia
2000 disestablishments in Virginia
Ice hockey clubs established in 1989
Sports clubs disestablished in 2000
Nashville Predators minor league affiliates
Washington Capitals minor league affiliates